Charlotte Kirk (born 16 June 1992) is a British actress, writer, and producer.

Early life 
Charlotte Kirk was born in Sidcup, Kent in 1992. The youngest daughter of Angela and Arthur Kirk. As a young girl, she was diagnosed with Dyslexia and Asperger syndrome.  

She first began theatre acting at the age of 9, performing in plays such as Agamemnon and Arturo Ui, followed by West End musical theatre productions of A Christmas Carol, Oliver Twist, and Hairspray. Having attended the prestigious Italia Conti Academy of Theatre Arts in London, her skills were further refined by training with Jigsaw Performing Arts in the UK and renowned method acting coaches Susan Batson and Lee Strasberg in New York City.

Career
Kirk was first recognised for her role in Vice (2016), a sci-fi thriller, opposite Bruce Willis and Thomas Jane. She has since completed eight feature films, including playing the female lead opposite Stephen Baldwin in film-noir comedy No Panic with a Hint of Hysteria (2016) and the female lead in psychological drama The Depths (2017), alongside appearances in How To Be Single (2017) and Ocean’s 8 (2018) starring opposite Sandra Bullock.

In 2018, Kirk began filming for the controversial conspiracy drama Nicole and O.J. in which she plays the title role of Nicole Brown Simpson.

She next co-wrote, produced, and starred in The Reckoning  directed by Neil Marshall.

In 2021, Kirk starred in, co-wrote, and co-produced the action horror movie The Lair, directed by Neil Marshall, released in US in October 2022 and in the UK in January 2023.

The Lair had its world premiere in London’s prestigious Leicester Square IMAX as the opening night gala presentation at 2022’s FrightFest film festival. 

Most recently, in the summer of 2022 Charlotte completed filming on the action crime thriller Duchess, which she co-wrote, produced, and plays the title role.

Kirk enjoys singing and has released two music videos, "Eyes in Love" and "I Get the Feeling Again" and performed the end title track for No Panic with a Hint of Hysteria.

She has also appeared on multiple magazine covers, including LA Magazine and Harper’s Bazaar in February 2023 which described her as "a beautiful, talented, and already renowned actor who is determined to take destiny into her own hands." as well as the "quintessential English rose."

Legal case 

In March 2019, leaked text messages showed that Kevin Tsujihara had promised auditions and acting jobs to Kirk in return for sex, facilitated by her then-friend, film mogul James Packer, in September 2013. WarnerMedia was investigating the allegations. In September 2020 her lawyers filed a petition in the Los Angeles Superior Court to vacate a gag order that has kept her mostly silent amid the years-long battle. The petition paints a picture of Tsujihara engaging in nonconsensual sex. The THR also revealed informations about how Tsujihara and former NBCUniversal Vice Chairman Ronald Meyer colluded to cover up the real nature of their relationships with Kirk, reached settlement and court cases.

Personal life 
Having grown up in South East London, Kirk moved to the US in her early 20s to pursue her career; first to New York, then to Los Angeles, where she spent the next 10 years

While living in LA Kirk met film and television director Neil Marshall. They began dating in 2018 and got engaged in late 2019. Kirk now lives with Marshall in England, having returned to the UK in 2021 to focus on creating her own projects with him. Together they formed Scarlett Productions Ltd. and have several feature film projects currently in development and production.

She is a passionate advocate of animal rights and has a King Charles Cavalier called Molly Prior, named after a character in The Reckoning.

Filmography

Film

Awards

Awards: 21 nominations, 19 wins

Additional awards

References

External links
 Official website
 

1992 births
21st-century British women writers
21st-century British screenwriters
Actresses from Kent
British film producers
English screenwriters
People with Asperger syndrome
Living people